Tim Pierce (born 1958 in Albuquerque) is an American session guitarist. He has worked for artists such as Joe Cocker, Crowded House, Goo Goo Dolls, Michael Jackson, Beth Hart, Roger Waters, Alice Cooper, Johnny Hallyday,  Phil Collins, the Cheetah Girls and Bon Jovi.

Pierce's parents were not musicians, although, unbeknownst to Pierce, his father used to play the trumpet in his youth. He first tasted mainstream success in the early 1980s, when he began recording with Rick Springfield, who was emerging as one of rock's biggest stars with his hit "Jessie's Girl". In addition to playing on the studio recordings that followed, he also joined Springfield's touring band throughout the 1980s and appears in several of Springfield's music videos from the era.

He has played on many hit songs including contributing second-guitar parts on Crowded House's "Don't Dream It's Over", mandolins and slide guitar on Goo Goo Dolls' "Iris", a rhythm guitar part during the bridge of Michael Jackson's "Black or White", which was inspired by the work of Mötley Crüe, and almost all guitar parts on the original recording of "Runaway" by Bon Jovi.

In 1995, Pierce released a solo album, Guitarland, on PRA Records.

In the 2010s, Pierce started a YouTube channel, on which he offers guitar tips from his years in the music industry.

Discography 
 Tim Pierce discography

References

External links
 
 
 Official website
 YouTube channel
 Interview in MelodicRock.com

1959 births
Living people
Musicians from Albuquerque, New Mexico
American session musicians
Guitarists from New Mexico
20th-century American guitarists
21st-century American guitarists